A mondegreen is a mishearing or misinterpretation of a phrase in a way that gives it a new meaning. Mondegreens are most often created by a person listening to a poem or a song; the listener, being unable to hear a lyric clearly, substitutes words that sound similar and make some kind of sense. The American writer Sylvia Wright coined the term in 1954, recalling a childhood memory of her mother reading the Scottish ballad "The Bonny Earl of Murray" (from Thomas Percy's 1765 book Reliques of Ancient English Poetry), and mishearing the words "layd him on the green" as "Lady Mondegreen".

"Mondegreen" was included in the 2000 edition of the Random House Webster's College Dictionary, and in the Oxford English Dictionary in 2002. Merriam-Webster's Collegiate Dictionary added the word in 2008.

Etymology
In a 1954 essay in Harper's Magazine, Sylvia Wright described how, as a young girl, she misheard the last line of the first stanza from the seventeenth-century ballad "The Bonnie Earl O' Moray". She wrote:

The correct fourth line is, "And laid him on the green". Wright explained the need for a new term:

Psychology
People are more likely to notice what they expect rather than things that are not part of their everyday experiences; this is known as confirmation bias. Similarly, one may mistake an unfamiliar stimulus for a familiar and more plausible version. For example, to consider a well-known mondegreen in the song "Purple Haze", one would be more likely to hear Jimi Hendrix singing that he is about to kiss this guy than that he is about to kiss the sky. Similarly, if a lyric uses words or phrases that the listener is unfamiliar with, they may be misheard as using more familiar terms.

The creation of mondegreens may be driven in part by cognitive dissonance, as the listener finds it psychologically uncomfortable to listen to a song and not make out the words. Steven Connor suggests that mondegreens are the result of the brain's constant attempts to make sense of the world by making assumptions to fill in the gaps when it cannot clearly determine what it is hearing. Connor sees mondegreens as the "wrenchings of nonsense into sense". This dissonance will be most acute when the lyrics are in a language in which the listener is fluent.

On the other hand, Steven Pinker has observed that mondegreen mishearings tend to be less plausible than the original lyrics, and that once a listener has "locked in" to a particular misheard interpretation of a song's lyrics, it can remain unquestioned, even when that plausibility becomes strained (see mumpsimus). Pinker gives the example of a student "stubbornly" mishearing the chorus to "Venus" ("I'm your Venus") as "I'm your penis", and being surprised that the song was allowed on the radio. The phenomenon may, in some cases, be triggered by people hearing "what they want to hear", as in the case of the song "Louie Louie": parents heard obscenities in the Kingsmen recording where none existed.

James Gleick claims that the mondegreen is a distinctly modern phenomenon. Without the improved communication and language standardization brought about by radio, he believes there would have been no way to recognize and discuss this shared experience. Just as mondegreens transform songs based on experience, a folk song learned by repetition often is transformed over time when sung by people in a region where some of the song's references have become obscure. A classic example is "The Golden Vanity", which contains the line "As she sailed upon the lowland sea". British immigrants carried the song to Appalachia, where singers, not knowing what the term lowland sea refers to, transformed it over generations from "lowland" to "lonesome".

Examples

In songs

The national anthem of the United States is highly susceptible to the creation of mondegreens, two in the first line. Francis Scott Key's "Star-Spangled Banner" begins with the line "O say can you see, by the dawn's early light". This has been accidentally and deliberately misinterpreted as "José, can you see", another example of the Hobson-Jobson effect, countless times. The second half of the line has been misheard as well, as "by the donzerly light", or other variants. This has led to many people believing that "donzerly" is an actual word.

Religious songs, learned by ear (and often by children), are another common source of mondegreens. The most-cited example is "Gladly, the cross-eyed bear" (from the line in the hymn "Keep Thou My Way" by Fanny Crosby and Theodore E. Perkins: "Kept by Thy tender care, gladly the cross I'll bear"). Jon Carroll and many others quote it as "Gladly the cross I'd bear"; also, here, hearers are confused by the sentence with the unusual object-subject-verb (OSV) word order. The song "I Was on a Boat That Day" by Old Dominion features a reference to this mondegreen.
 
Mondegreens expanded as a phenomenon with radio, and, especially, the growth of rock and roll (and even more so with rap). Amongst the most-reported examples are:

"There's a bathroom on the right" (the line at the end of each verse of "Bad Moon Rising" by Creedence Clearwater Revival: "There's a bad moon on the rise").
"Scuse me while I kiss this guy" (from a lyric in the song "Purple Haze" by The Jimi Hendrix Experience: "'Scuse me while I kiss the sky").
"The girl with colitis goes by" (from a lyric in the Beatles song "Lucy in the Sky with Diamonds":  "The girl with kaleidoscope eyes")

Both Creedence's John Fogerty and Hendrix eventually acknowledged these mishearings by deliberately singing the "mondegreen" versions of their songs in concert.

"Blinded by the Light", a cover of a Bruce Springsteen song by Manfred Mann's Earth Band, contains what has been called "probably the most misheard lyric of all time". The phrase "revved up like a deuce", altered from Springsteen's original "cut loose like a deuce", both lyrics referring to the hot rodders slang deuce (short for deuce coupé) for a 1932 Ford coupé, is frequently misheard as "wrapped up like a douche". Springsteen himself has joked about the phenomenon, claiming that it was not until Manfred Mann rewrote the song to be about a "feminine hygiene product" that the song became popular.

Another commonly cited example of a song susceptible to mondegreens is Nirvana's "Smells Like Teen Spirit", with the line "here we are now, entertain us" variously being misinterpreted as "here we are now, in containers", and "here we are now, hot potatoes", amongst other renditions.

Rap and hip hop lyrics may be particularly susceptible to being misheard because they do not necessarily follow standard pronunciations. The delivery of rap lyrics relies heavily upon an often regional pronunciation or non-traditional accenting of words and their phonemes to adhere to the artist's stylizations and the lyrics' written structure. This issue is exemplified in controversies over alleged transcription errors in Yale University Press's 2010 Anthology of Rap.

Standardized and recorded mondegreens
Sometimes, the modified version of a lyric becomes standard, as is the case with "The Twelve Days of Christmas". The original has "four colly birds" (colly means black; compare A Midsummer Night's Dream: "Brief as the lightning in the collied night"); by the turn of the twentieth century, these had been replaced by calling birds, which is the lyric used in the now-standard 1909 Frederic Austin version. Another example is found in ELO's song "Don't Bring Me Down. The original recorded lyric was "don't bring me down, Gruss!", but fans misheard it as "don't bring me down, Bruce!". Eventually, ELO began playing the song with the Mondegreen lyric.

The song "Sea Lion Woman", recorded in 1939 by Christine and Katherine Shipp, was performed by Nina Simone under the title "See Line Woman". According to the liner notes from the compilation A Treasury of Library of Congress Field Recordings, the correct title of this playground song might also be "See [the] Lyin' Woman" or "C-Line Woman". Jack Lawrence's misinterpretation of the French phrase "pauvre Jean" ("poor John") as the identically pronounced "pauvres gens" ("poor people") led to the translation of La Goualante du pauvre Jean ("The Ballad of Poor John") as "The Poor People of Paris", a hit song in 1956.

In literature

A Monk Swimming by author Malachy McCourt is so titled because of a childhood mishearing of a phrase from the Catholic rosary prayer, Hail Mary. "Amongst women" became "a monk swimmin'".

The title and plot of the short science fiction story "Come You Nigh: Kay Shuns" ("Com-mu-ni-ca-tions") by Lawrence A. Perkins, in Analog Science Fiction and Fact magazine (April 1970), deals with securing interplanetary radio communications by encoding them with mondegreens.

Olive, the Other Reindeer is a 1997 children's book by Vivian Walsh, which borrows its title from a mondegreen of the line, "all of the other reindeer" in the song "Rudolph the Red-Nosed Reindeer". The book was adapted into an animated Christmas special in 1999.

The travel guide book series Lonely Planet is named after the misheard phrase "lovely planet" sung by Joe Cocker in Matthew Moore's song "Space Captain".

In film

A monologue of mondegreens appears in the 1971 film Carnal Knowledge. The camera focuses on actress Candice Bergen laughing as she recounts various phrases that fooled her as a child, including "Round John Virgin" (instead of “‘Round yon virgin...”) and "Gladly, the cross-eyed bear" (instead of “Gladly the cross I’d bear”). The title of the 2013 film Ain't Them Bodies Saints is a misheard lyric from a folk song; director David Lowery decided to use it because it evoked the "classical, regional" feel of 1970s rural Texas.

In the 1994 film The Santa Clause, a child identifies a ladder that Santa uses to get to the roof from its label: The Rose Suchak Ladder Company. He states that this is "just like the poem", misinterpreting "out on the lawn there arose such a clatter" from A Visit from St. Nicholas as "Out on the lawn, there's a Rose Suchak ladder".

In television

Mondegreens have been used in many television advertising campaigns, including:

 An advertisement for the 2012 Volkswagen Passat touting the car's audio system shows a number of people singing incorrect versions of the line "Burning out his fuse up here alone" from the Elton John/Bernie Taupin song "Rocket Man", until a woman listening to the song in a Passat realizes the correct words.
 A 2002 advertisement for T-Mobile shows spokeswoman Catherine Zeta-Jones helping to correct a man who has misunderstood the chorus of Def Leppard's "Pour Some Sugar On Me" as "pour some shook up ramen".
 A series of advertisements for Maxell audio cassette tapes, produced by Howell Henry Chaldecott Lury, shown in 1989 and 1990, featured misheard versions of "Israelites" (e.g., "Me ears are alight") by Desmond Dekker and "Into the Valley" by The Skids as heard by users of other brands of tape.
 A 1987 series of advertisements for Kellogg's Nut 'n Honey Crunch featured a joke in which one person asks "What's for breakfast?" and is told "Nut 'N' Honey", which is misheard as "Nothing, honey".

Other notable examples

The traditional game Chinese whispers ("Telephone" or "Gossip" in North America) involves mishearing a whispered sentence to produce successive mondegreens that gradually distort the original sentence as it is repeated by successive listeners.
Among schoolchildren in the US, daily rote recitation of the Pledge of Allegiance has long provided opportunities for the genesis of mondegreens.

Speech-to-text functionality in modern smartphone messaging apps and search or assist functions may be hampered by faulty speech recognition. It has been noted that in text messaging, users often leave uncorrected mondegreens as a joke or puzzle for the recipient to solve. This wealth of mondegreens has proven to be a fertile ground for study by speech scientists and psychologists.

Notable collections

The classicist and linguist Steve Reece has collected examples of English mondegreens in song lyrics, religious creeds and liturgies, commercials and advertisements, and jokes and riddles.  He has used this collection to shed light on the process of "junctural metanalysis" during the oral transmission of the ancient Greek epics, the Iliad and Odyssey.

Reverse mondegreen
A reverse mondegreen is the intentional production, in speech or writing, of words or phrases that seem to be gibberish but disguise meaning. A prominent example is Mairzy Doats, a 1943 novelty song by Milton Drake, Al Hoffman, and Jerry Livingston. The lyrics are a reverse mondegreen, made up of same-sounding words or phrases (sometimes also referred to as "oronyms"), so pronounced (and written) as to challenge the listener (or reader) to interpret them:

Mairzy doats and dozy doats and liddle lamzy divey
A kiddley divey too, wouldn't you?

The clue to the meaning is contained in the bridge of the song:

If the words sound queer and funny to your ear, a little bit jumbled and jivey,
Sing "Mares eat oats and does eat oats and little lambs eat ivy."

This makes it clear that the last line is "A kid'll eat ivy, too; wouldn't you?"

Deliberate mondegreen

Two authors have written books of supposed foreign-language poetry that are actually mondegreens of nursery rhymes in English. Luis van Rooten's pseudo-French Mots D'Heures: Gousses, Rames includes critical, historical, and interpretive apparatus, as does John Hulme's Mörder Guss Reims, attributed to a fictitious German poet. Both titles sound like the phrase "Mother Goose Rhymes". Both works can also be considered soramimi, which produces different meanings when interpreted in another language. The genre of animutation is based on deliberate mondegreen.

Wolfgang Amadeus Mozart produced a similar effect in his canon "Difficile Lectu" (Difficult to Read), which, though ostensibly in Latin, is actually an opportunity for scatological humor in both German and Italian.

Some performers and writers have used deliberate mondegreens to create double entendres. The phrase "if you see Kay" (F-U-C-K) has been employed many times, notably as a line from James Joyce's 1922 novel Ulysses.

"Mondegreen" is a song by Yeasayer on their 2010 album, Odd Blood. The lyrics are intentionally obscure (for instance, "Everybody sugar in my bed" and "Perhaps the pollen in the air turns us into a stapler") and spoken hastily to encourage the mondegreen effect.

Anguish Languish is an ersatz language created by Howard L. Chace. A play on the words "English Language," it is based on homophonic transformations of English words and consists entirely of deliberate mondegreens that seem nonsensical in print but are more easily understood when spoken aloud. A notable example is the story "Ladle Rat Rotten Hut" ("Little Red Riding Hood"), which appears in his collection of stories and poems, Anguish Languish (Prentice-Hall, 1956).

Related linguistic phenomena 
Closely related categories are Hobson-Jobson, where a word from a foreign language is homophonically translated into one's own language, e.g. "cockroach" from Spanish cucaracha, and soramimi, a Japanese term for deliberate homophonic misinterpretation of words for humor.

An unintentionally incorrect use of similar-sounding words or phrases, resulting in a changed meaning, is a malapropism. If there is a connection in meaning, it may be called an eggcorn. If a person stubbornly continues to mispronounce a word or phrase after being corrected, that person has committed a mumpsimus.

Related phenomena include:

 Earworm
 Eggcorn
 Holorime
 Homophonic translation
 Hypercorrection
 Phono-semantic matching
 Spoonerism
 Syntactic ambiguity

Non-English languages

Croatian
Queen's song "Another One Bites The Dust" has a long-standing history as a mondegreen in Croatian, misheard as "Radovan baca daske", which means "Radovan (a male given name) throws planks". This might also be a soramimi.

Dutch
In Dutch, mondegreens are popularly referred to as Mama appelsap ("Mommy applejuice"), from the Michael Jackson song Wanna Be Startin' Somethin' which features the lyrics Mama-se mama-sa ma-ma-coo-sa, and was once misheard as Mama say mama sa mam[a]appelsap. The Dutch radio station 3FM show Superrradio (originally Timur Open Radio), run by Timur Perlin and Ramon, featured an item in which listeners were encouraged to send in mondegreens under the name "Mama appelsap". The segment was popular for years.

French
In French, the phenomenon is also known as hallucination auditive, especially when referring to pop songs.

The title of the film La Vie en Rose ("Life In Pink" literally; "Life Through Rose-Coloured Glasses" more broadly), depicting the life of Édith Piaf, can be mistaken for L'Avion Rose ("The Pink Airplane").

The title of the 1983 French novel Le Thé au harem d'Archi Ahmed ("Tea in the Harem of Archi Ahmed") by Mehdi Charef (and the 1985 movie of the same name) is based on the main character mishearing le théorème d'Archimède ("the theorem of Archimedes") in his mathematics class.

A classic example in French is similar to the "Lady Mondegreen" anecdote: in his 1962 collection of children's quotes La Foire aux cancres, the humorist Jean-Charles refers to a misunderstood lyric of "La Marseillaise" (the French national anthem): Entendez-vous ... mugir ces féroces soldats ("Do you hear those savage soldiers roar?") is misheard as ...Séféro, ce soldat ("that soldier Séféro").

German
Mondegreens are a well-known phenomenon in German, especially where non-German songs are concerned. They are sometimes called, after a well-known example, Agathe Bauer-songs ("I got the power", a song by Snap!, misinterpreted as a German female name). Journalist Axel Hacke published a series of books about them, beginning with Der weiße Neger Wumbaba ("The White Negro Wumbaba", a mishearing of the line der weiße Nebel wunderbar from "Der Mond ist aufgegangen").

In urban legend, children's paintings of nativity scenes, occasionally include next to the Child, Mary, Joseph, and so on, an additional, laughing creature known as the Owi. The reason is to be found in the line Gottes Sohn! O wie lacht / Lieb' aus Deinem göttlichen Mund ("God's Son! Oh, how does love laugh out of Thy divine mouth!") from the song "Silent Night". The subject is Lieb, a poetic contraction of die Liebe leaving off the final -e and the definite article, so that the phrase might be misunderstood as being about a person named Owi laughing "in a loveable manner". Owi lacht has been used as the title of at least one book about Christmas and Christmas songs.

Hebrew
Ghil'ad Zuckermann mentions the example mukhrakhím liyót saméakh (which means "we must be happy", with a grammatical error) as a mondegreen of the original úru 'akhím belév saméakh (which means "wake up, brothers, with a happy heart"). Although this line is taken from the extremely well-known song "Háva Nagíla" ("Let’s be happy"), given the Hebrew high-register of úru ( "wake up!"), Israelis often mishear it.

An Israeli site dedicated to Hebrew mondegreens has coined the term avatiach (Hebrew for "watermelon") for "mondegreen", named for a common mishearing of Shlomo Artzi's award-winning 1970 song "Ahavtia" ("I loved her", using a form uncommon in spoken Hebrew).

Polish
A paper in phonology cites memoirs of the poet Antoni Słonimski, who confessed that in the recited poem Konrad Wallenrod he used to hear zwierz Alpuhary ("a beast of Alpujarras") rather than z wież Alpuhary ("from the towers of Alpujarras").

Russian
In 1875 Fyodor Dostoyevsky cited a line from Fyodor Glinka's song "Troika" (1825), колокольчик, дар Валдая ("the bell, gift of Valday"), stating that it is usually understood as колокольчик, дарвалдая ("the bell darvaldaying"—supposedly an onomatopoeia of ringing sounds).

See also 

 Am I Right – website with a large collection of misheard lyrics
 Bushism
 Folk etymology
 Mad Gab
 Pareidolia
 Parody music
 Yanny or Laurel
 Bennie and the Jets
 soramimi – Japanese version of the mondegreen

Notes and references

Explanatory notes

Citations

Further reading
 Connor, Steven. Earslips: Of Mishearings and Mondegreens, 2009.
 Maria Konnikova. Excuse Me While I Kiss This Guy, 2014. Excuse Me While I Kiss This Guy
 Edwards, Gavin. Scuse Me While I Kiss This Guy, 1995. 
 Edwards, Gavin. When a Man Loves a Walnut, 1997. 
 Edwards, Gavin. He's Got the Whole World in His Pants, 1996. 
 Edwards, Gavin. Deck the Halls with Buddy Holly, 1998. 
 Gwynne, Fred. Chocolate Moose for Dinner, 1988. 
 Norman, Philip. Your Walrus Hurt the One You Love: Malapropisms, Mispronunciations, and Linguistic Cock-ups, 1988. .

External links

 Snopes.com: "The Lady and the Mondegreen" (misheard Christmas songs).
 Pamela Licalzi O'Connell: "Sweet Slips of the Ear: Mondegreens", The New York Times, 9 April 1998.

 
1950s neologisms
Humour
Phonology
Psychoacoustics
Semantics